The 2011–12 Algerian U21 Cup was the first edition of the Algerian U21 Cup. JSM Béjaïa won the competition by beating ASO Chlef 2-0 in the final.

Semi-finals

Matches

Final

Match details

References

Algerian U21 Cup